Dawn Breaks Open Like a Wound That Bleeds Afresh is an EP by Gnaw Their Tongues, released in November 2007 by Universal Tongue.

Track listing

Personnel
Adapted from the Dawn Breaks Open Like a Wound That Bleeds Afresh liner notes.
 Maurice de Jong (as Mories) – vocals, instruments, recording, cover art

Release history

References

External links 
 

2007 EPs
Gnaw Their Tongues albums